Bigelow School may refer to:

Bigelow School (Boston, Massachusetts), listed on the National Register of Historic Places in Suffolk County, Massachusetts
Bigelow School (Mequon, Wisconsin), listed on the National Register of Historic Places in Ozaukee County, Wisconsin